Bebeto (born 1964), José Roberto Gama de Oliveira, is a Brazilian politician and former football forward

Bebeto may also refer to:

 Bebeto de Freitas (1950–2018), Paulo Roberto de Freitas, Brazilian volleyball coach
 Bebeto (footballer, born 1958), Bogusław Baniak, Polish football midfielder and football manager
 El Bebeto (born 1989), Carlos Alberto García Villanueva, Mexican singer
 Bara Bebeto (born 1991), Bara Mamadou Lamine Ndiaye, Senegalese football forward
 Bebeto (footballer, born 1990), Roberto de Jesus Machado, Brazilian football right-back for Tondela